The East Branch Swift River is a  tributary of the Swift River in western Maine. Via the Swift River, it is part of the Androscoggin River watershed, which flows to the Kennebec River and ultimately the Atlantic Ocean.

See also
List of rivers of Maine

References

Maine Streamflow Data from the USGS
Maine Watershed Data From Environmental Protection Agency

Tributaries of the Kennebec River
Rivers of Maine
Rivers of Franklin County, Maine